Rumonge is a commune of Rumonge Province in southwestern Burundi.  Its headquarters are at Rumonge, which is also the provincial capital. In 2007, DGHER electrified three rural villages in the commune.

References

Communes of Burundi
Rumonge Province